Mbalizi Road is an administrative ward in the Mbeya Urban district of the Mbeya Region of Tanzania. In 2016 the Tanzania National Bureau of Statistics report there were 6,662 people in the ward, from 6,045 in 2012.

Neighborhoods 
The ward has 4 neighborhoods.
 Kabisa
 Kisoki
 Mwasyoge
 Sabasaba

References 

Wards of Mbeya Region